Charles Fletcher may refer to:

Charles K. Fletcher (1902–1985), U.S. Representative from California
Charles Joseph Fletcher (1923–2011), American inventor and businessman
Charles Brunsdon Fletcher (1859–1946), English-born Australian surveyor and journalist
Charles Tenshin Fletcher, Zen Buddhist
Charles Fletcher (composer) (1884–1965), American composer
Charles H. Fletcher III, climate scientist
Charles Henry Fletcher (1837–1922), American businessman
Charles George Fletcher (1890–1959), lawyer and political figure in Ontario
Charles L. Fletcher (born 1971), American architectural consultant and interior designer